Lake District News  is a local newspaper in Burns Lake, British Columbia.  Paper is owned by Black Press published Wednesday.

See also
List of newspapers in Canada

References

External links
Lake District News – Official website.

Publications with year of establishment missing
Weekly newspapers published in British Columbia